This is a list of parliaments of Ireland to 1801.  For subsequent parliaments, see the list of parliaments of the United Kingdom.  For post-1918 parliaments, see elections in Ireland.  Parliaments before 1264 are not currently listed.

The Kingdoms of Ireland and Great Britain joined on 1 January 1801. For subsequent Parliaments see the list of Parliaments of the United Kingdom.

References
 A New History of Ireland, Volume IX, edited by T. W. Moody, F.X. Martin and F.J. Byrne (Clarendon Press 1984), 

Parliament of Ireland
Parliaments